Phalonidia manniana is a moth of the family Tortricidae. It is found in most of Europe.

The wingspan is 10–13 mm. The head is white, its sides ochreous-brown. The forewings have  moderately arched costa. The forewing ground colour is whitish-ochreous, its margins strigulated with brown. There is a suffusion along the base of the costa, an oblique streak from dorsum near the base and a median fascia angulated above middle. There is a fascia-like spot from costa posteriorly which does not reach the termen, and indistinct suffusions before and above the tornus All are deep ochreous, sometimes brown-sprinkled. The hindwings are pale grey.

Adults are on wing from June to August depending on the location.

Larvae have been recorded on Mentha piperita, Mentha aquatica, Mentha longifolia, Alisma plantago-aquatica, Butomus, Lycopus and Inula.

References

External links
Lepidoptera of Belgium
UK Moths

Phalonidia
Moths of Japan
Moths of Europe
Moths described in 1839
Taxa named by Josef Emanuel Fischer von Röslerstamm